The key light is the first and usually most important light that a photographer, cinematographer, lighting cameraman, or other scene composer will use in a lighting setup. The purpose of the key light is to highlight the form and dimension of the subject. The key light is not a rigid requirement; omitting the key light can result in a silhouette effect. Many key lights may be placed in a scene to illuminate a moving subject at opportune moments.

Position of camera
The key light can be "hard" (focused) or "soft" (diffused), and depending on the desired setup can be placed at different angles relative to the subject. When part of the most common setup—three-point lighting—the key light is placed at a 30–60° angle (with the camera marking 0 degrees). In addition to the horizontal angle, the key light can be placed high or low producing different effects. The most common vertical position for the key light is at a 30° angle (i.e. slightly above the eye line; the nose should not cast a shadow on the lips).

A key light positioned low appears to distort the actor's features, since most natural or ambient light is normally overhead. A dramatic effect used in horror or comedy cinematography is a key light illuminating the face from below. A high key light will result in more prominent cheek bones and long nose shadows. Marlene Dietrich was famous for insisting that her key light be placed high.

Lighting a scene
Using just a key light results in a high-contrast scene, especially if the background is not illuminated. A fill light decreases contrast and adds more details to the dark areas of an image. An alternative to the fill light is to reflect existing light or to illuminate other objects in the scene, which in turn further illuminate the subject.

The key light does not have to directly illuminate the subject: it may pass through various filters, screens, or reflectors. Light passing through tree leaves, window panes, and other obstacles can make a scene more visually interesting, as well as cue the audience to the location of the subject. The key light also does not have to be white light—a colored key (especially when used with fill or back lighting of other colors) can add more emotional depth to a scene than full white alone. In mixed indoor/outdoor daytime scenes, sunlight may appear to be a warm white, and indoor lighting to be a neutral or artificially-toned white. By contrast, moonlight appears to be cooler than indoor lighting.

Lighting choices
In many cases, the key light is a stage light for indoor scenes, or sunlight for outdoors. A lighting instrument may also be used outdoors to supplement sunlight or as the primary light source with sunlight or skylight serving as fill lighting. Actual lamps, lighting fixtures, can serve as key lights, provided they are of sufficient brightness. They may also appear within the scene as props — in which case they are called "practicals." Similarly, fire, candles and other natural sources of light can be used

See also
 High-key lighting
 Low-key lighting
 Low-key photography
 Stage lighting instrument
 McCandless method
 Top-left lighting

Cinematography
Stage lighting
Photographic techniques
Film and video terminology